¡Mira quién baila! (Look Who's Dancing), also known as MQB, is an American Spanish-language reality show that premiered on September 12, 2010, on Univision. The TV series is the Hispanic American version of the British show Strictly Come Dancing and its American adaptation Dancing with the Stars. The show involves celebrities (including singers, actors and others) being paired up with professional dancers. Each couple performs ballroom or Latin dances and competes for judges' critiques and audience votes. Whichever couple receives the lowest total amount of judges' critique and fewest audience votes is eliminated until a champion is named at the end. Each celebrity competes for a grand total of $50,000 for a charity of their choice.

The series has been renewed for a tenth season, that premiered on October 9, 2022.

Cast

Cast timeline
Color key:

Series overview

Ratings 
 

| link6            = Mira quién baila (season 6)
| episodes6        = 8
| start6           = 
| startrating6     = 1.4
| end6             = 
| endrating6       = 1.4
| viewers6         = |2}} 

| link7            = Mira quién baila (season 7)
| episodes7        = 6
| start7           = 
| startrating7     = 1.8
| end7             = 
| endrating7       = 2.0
| viewers7         = |2}} 

| link8            = Mira quién baila (season 8)
| episodes8        = 7
| start8           = 
| startrating8     = 1.9
| end8             = 
| endrating8       = 1.9
| viewers8         = |2}} 

| link9            = Mira quién baila (season 9)
| episodes9        = 6
| start9           = 
| startrating9     = 1.8
| end9             = 
| endrating9       = 1.7
| viewers9         = |2}} 

| link10           = Mira quién baila (season 10)
| episodes10       = 6
| start10          = 
| startrating10    = 1.3
| end10            = 
| endrating10      = 1.3
| viewers10        = |2}} 
}}

Mexico ratings

Awards and nominations

References

External links
 
 Official Twitter
 Official Facebook

2010 American television series debuts
2010s American reality television series
Univision original programming
American television series based on British television series
Spanish-language television shows
2020s American reality television series